Uruguayan peso has been a name of the Uruguayan currency since Uruguay's settlement by Europeans. The present currency, the peso uruguayo was adopted in 1993 and is subdivided into 100 centésimos, although centésimos are not currently in use.

Introduction
Uruguay obtained monetary stability in 1896, based on the gold standard. This favorable state of affairs ended after World War I. An unsettled period followed. Economic difficulties after World War II produced inflation, which became serious after 1964 and continued into the 1970s.

The peso moneda nacional was replaced on 1 July 1975 by the nuevo peso (new peso; ISO 4217 code ) at a rate of 1 new peso for 1000 old pesos. The nuevo peso was also subdivided into 100 centésimos.

Inflation
Uruguayans became accustomed to the constant devaluation of their currency. Uruguayans refer to periods of real appreciation of the currency as atraso cambiario, which literally means that "the exchange rate is running late" towards future devaluement. As a consequence of the instability of the local currency, prices for most big-ticket items (real estate, cars and even executives' salaries) are denominated in U.S. dollars.

During the military rule, the peso was on a crawling peg to the dollar. A table of the future value of the dollar was published daily by the government (called the tablita). In 1982, the currency was abruptly devalued ("the tablita was broken"), throwing thousands of companies and individuals into bankruptcy. In the 1990s, a new mechanism to provide predictability was introduced, this time in the form of a sliding range, with top and bottom margins, at which the government would intervene. In 2002, after a banking crisis and amid a huge budget deficit, the currency was again allowed to float, losing almost 50% of its value in a couple of weeks, and, again, throwing into bankruptcy thousands of companies and individuals who held debts denominated in US dollars.

In 2004 a phenomenon completely new to most Uruguayans developed: the currency appreciated in nominal terms against the US dollar, going from 30 to 24 pesos to the dollar. By 2008 the peso reached 19 to the US dollar, recovering more than half of its loss during the crisis. This revaluation brought protests from the industrial sector, which felt that it lost competitiveness, but by July 2020, the peso had inflated to over 40 to the dollar. The government hopes that a floating currency will "de-dollarize" the economy. Uruguay does not seem to have found a mechanism that provides the exchange rate some level of predictability, while at the same time allowing the country to adapt its prices so that its exports remain competitive.

Coins
In 1994, stainless-steel 10, 20 and 50 centésimos and brass 1 and 2 pesos uruguayos were introduced. 5 and 10 pesos uruguayos were introduced in 2003 and 2004, respectively. The coins replaced same value notes. Coins in circulation are:

In July 2010, 50 centésimos coins were withdrawn from circulation.

New 1, 2, 5, and 10 pesos coins were introduced in January 2011.

Banknotes
In 1995–1996, banknotes in denominations of, 5, 10, 20, 50, 100, 200, 500 (all modified versions of 5,000, 10,000, 20,000, 50,000, 100,000, 200,000 and 500,000 nuevo peso banknotes respectively) and 1000 pesos uruguayos were introduced, followed by new models of 5 and 10 pesos uruguayos notes in 1999. In 2003, 5 and 10 pesos uruguayos notes have been replaced by coins and 2000 pesos uruguayos were introduced. A new series of banknotes were introduced in 2014–2015, the same as the previous issue without the vertical word "URUGUAY" on the left side. Banknotes in circulation are:

Central Bank Digital Currency (CBDC)
Although in many parts of the world, the amount of cash in circulation has risen over the last decade, there are some countries that buck the trend. In this small club of jurisdictions, a few have considered general purpose CBDCs that would be a complement to cash. Sweden and Uruguay are notable not just for the advanced stage of their work but the amount of information their central banks have made publicly available about their respective projects.

Unidad Previsional (UP) 
Uruguay maintains a currency account unit named  (UP), ISO 4217 code .

Unidad Indexada (UI) 
 (UP), ISO 4217 code , is a consumer price indicator for Uruguay.

See also
 Economy of Uruguay
 Argentine peso 
 Chilean peso

References

External links
Monedas del Uruguay (Coins of Uruguay)

Economy of Uruguay
Currencies introduced in 1993
Currencies of South America